Fatos Thanas Nano (born 16 September 1952) is an Albanian socialist politician who served as Prime Minister of Albania in 1991, from 1997 to 1998 and from 2002 to 2005. He was the first leader and founder of the Socialist Party of Albania and a member of the Albanian Parliament from 1991 to 1993 and 1997 to 2009. He reformed the anti-revisionist Marxist-Leninist ideology of the Labor Party of Albania into social democracy for its successor, the Socialist Party. During his leadership, the Socialist Party, as a result of reforms, joined the Socialist International and Party of European Socialists. Nano was a candidate in the 2007 presidential election but did not win. He again tried in the 2012 presidential election, but he did not even qualify as a candidate, because the leaders of parties in Parliament obstructed their respective MPs to elect him as candidate in the elections.

Personal history
Fatos Nano was born in Tirana. His parents were Thanas Nano, a former director of Albanian Radio Television, and Maria Nano (née Shuteriqi), a government official. He was the only male child among female siblings in the family. He grew up in Hoxha Tahsim Street in East Tirana, attended and graduated from “Sami Frasheri” High School, reserved for the children of the nomenklatura. In the early years of adolescence, Nano was eager to learn foreign languages and used to play the guitar. In his second year of high school, he founded a rock group of which he was the lead singer; they played the music of the Beatles, strictly forbidden to the general public at the time. He graduated in Political Economy from the University of Tirana in 1974. After graduation in 1978, Nano worked in the management of the metallurgical mills of Elbasan until 1981. From 1981 until 1984, Nano served as an economist at Priska's Agricultural Farm in Tirana. In 1984, he was appointed as a researcher of socio-economic problems and reforms of market economies of Eastern Bloc countries in the Institute of Marxist-Leninist Studies in Tirana, where he worked until 1990. When Fatos Nano was working in the Marxist-Leninist Institute, he was under the observation of Nexhmije Hoxha, Enver Hoxha's wife. He was singled out for special favor. Nexhmije Hoxha reportedly followed his career and helped him at strategic points to move from job to job.

Early political career
He began his political career in December 1990, where he was first appointed as Secretary General of the Council of Ministers. In January 1991, he was promoted to the position of Deputy Prime Minister, still in the government of Adil Çarçani. The fall of the communist regimes in various Central and Eastern European countries forced President Ramiz Alia to gradually remove the old communist nomenklatura from power and government, so in the end of February 1991, Alia appointed Nano as Prime Minister of the transitional government with the purpose of organizing the first post-communist democratic elections in the country being held that year and to prepare the transition of the country towards liberal democracy and market economy. The Parliamentary Elections were held on 31 March 1991 where the Labour Party of Albania won the majority. Ramiz Alia appointed Nano for the second time as the new Prime Minister. However, his new government did not last longer than the first as one week after a General Strike organized by the independent unions forced him to resign a couple of weeks later. The 10th Congress of the Labor Party was held in June 1991, which took three important decisions; first it changed the name of Labour Party to Socialist Party, then  it expelled all the members of the Politburo, and then it elected Nano as the new leader of the Socialist Party on 13 June 1991.

Imprisonment
After the Democratic Party of Albania won the parliamentary election of 22 March 1992, the Parliament set up a commission in early 1993 to investigate the activity of Fatos Nano for alleged corruption and abuse with management of humanitarian aid given by the Italian state during the economic crisis that lasted from 1990 until early 1992. This was a sophisticated way to imprison Nano due to his strong opposition to the autocratic signs of President Sali Berisha and due to the inefficiency and inability of the government headed by Aleksander Meksi to accomplish effective economic reforms. Nano was right about this, because the government of the Democratic Party permitted the notorious Ponzi schemes (known as pyramid schemes in Albania) which resulted in the unrest of 1997 where the majority of Albanians lost their savings, instead of effective economical reforms. On 27 July 1993 the Albanian Parliament approved the request of the General Attorney, Alush Dragoshi to take off the legislative immunity for Nano. On 30 July 1993 Nano was arrested in the office of the Prosecutor, and charged with "abuse of duty and the falsification of official documents in connection with Italian aid" following the use of a single vendor which overcharged and delivered foodstuffs which were unfit for consumption. On 3 April 1994, Nano was sentenced to twelve years in prison. A petition signed by 700 thousand people was sent to President Berisha to free Nano from prison. Nano was considered a political prisoner by the Socialist Party of Albania, Amnesty International, Human Right Watch (former Helsinki Watch), Inter-Parliamentary Union, and other groups, so he was let to be the chairman of it. To do his job from the prison, he used his ex-wife, Rexhina Nano, as intermediate to send directives to the party leadership, sometimes verbally, sometimes in written form. After imprisonment, Nano decided that the party should be led by three Deputy Chairmen and one Secretary General to continue the party's political battle.

Since the rejection of the revised Albanian Constitution during the 1994 Referendum, the foreign relations between Albania, the European Union and the United States began to deteriorate due to autocratic manners of President Berisha in the matters of the state, but they also were sceptical about the abilities of the leadership of the Socialist Party to govern the country, in case the Socialist Party were to win the Parliamentary Elections of 1996. The foreign diplomats also expressed concern toward the neutral stance the Socialist leadership (except Nano) held about Enver Hoxha and the positive stance toward Marxism-Leninism, which was implemented in the programme and the statute of the party by Servet Pellumbi. They called the socialist leadership (except Nano, who was not affiliated with Labor Party) as "dinosaurs from the old epoch".

In 1996, Nano wrote a letter the 2nd Congress of the Party (Keshilli i Pergjithshem Drejtues), held on July–August 1996, to initiate a "Motion for Debate" to remove from the top positions of party anyone who was affiliated in any way with the Labour Party, because Nano thought that the top positions, i.e. the leadership of the party, should be held by intellectuals, like Rexhep Meidani, Pandeli Majko, Kastriot Islami, etc. This was an imperative because it was part of the ongoing process to reform the party in order to join the Socialist International and the Party of European Socialists. The "Motion for Debate", requested by Nano, also required, to implement the recommendations made by State Department, European Parliament and European Council, for the solution of the political and institutional crisis, as official stance of the Socialist Party, also to propose the Congress to remove Marxist and statist concepts from the party's statute and programme, also to deny Vladimir Lenin and Comintern and rehabilitate Karl Kautsky and Second Internationale. The motion was supported by the majority of the socialist members and also by the civil society, and was approved as a consequence by the congress.

In 1997, the collapse of Ponzi schemes marked the beginning of an armed popular revolt against President Berisha, who was forced to resign in July 1997.  Berisha called untimely parliamentary elections on 29 June and he decreed a general amnesty to all prisoners in March 1997; Nano too was released from prison. Nano was found innocent by a court in Tirana for his alleged abuse of power and corruption in 1999.

Second and third premierships

The parliamentary elections of 29 June 1997 were an overwhelming victory for the Socialist Party of Albania. Nano was appointed Prime Minister by President Rexhep Meidani. The goal of Nano and the socialist government was to rebuild the ruined country, strengthen its economy and reconcile its people divided by political beliefs, but this was almost impossible with the destructive opposition led by former President Berisha. A coup d'état was attempted on 14 September 1998 by the leadership and the radical followers of the Democratic Party of Albania during the funeral of Azem Hajdari with the goal of taking power by force and murdering Nano. To avoid his murder by the angry mob, Nano decided to flee to the government residence in Pogradec. In the 1990s, Greece preferred and assisted Fatos Nano as Albanian leader due to him being Orthodox over Sali Berisha, a Muslim, as Nano was seen as being friendlier to Greek interests. The government of Fatos Nano was viewed by Turkey as having a pro-Greek orientation and expressed some dissatisfaction though during that time still maintained close military relations with Albania in rebuilding its armed forces and a military base. During 1998 Albania's Organisation of Islamic Cooperation (OIC) membership was suspended and temporarily withdrawn by prime-minister Fatos Nano who viewed it as inhibiting Albania's European aspirations. On 28 September 1998 Nano chose to resign and retired from political life.

After the Socialist Party won for the second time, in the Parliamentary Elections on 24 June 2001, Nano returned to politics again after 2 years of inactivity by starting the movement called Catharsis, with the goal to cripple the agreement between Rama and Meta to share the political power between them for the next 10 years.

In early 2002, Nano unsuccessfully tried to run for President of Albania, but on 25 July 2002 he was appointed by newly elected President Alfred Moisiu as Prime Minister for the third time. Just days after retaking office in August 2002, Nano came under attack by leading Italian weekly L'Espresso, which accused him of having ties to international organized-crime groups, and having been involved in a cigarette-smuggling ring with Naples-based mobsters. Nano sued the magazine in a court in Rome which ruled in favor of Nano. The court found the article to contain untrue information and speculations with the purpose of harming Nano during his term in office. The news magazine was ordered to pay Nano €3 million euros, and sentenced the magazine's director Daniela Hamaoi and the authors of the article Claudio Papayani, Dina Nasecti and Giuseppe Roli with 18 months in jail for groundlessly connecting Nano to the crime and mafia in Albania.

In the winter of 2004, a number of protests with over 20,000 people were organized by the opposition led by Sali Berisha demanding Nano to resign as prime minister which came known as the "Nano Go Away" Movement. In 2004, the civil society group Mjaft! protested in front of Nano's office against the alleged import of waste from Italy to Albania.

Resignation
On 3 July 2005 the Socialist Party lost the elections and its majority in parliament. Nano resigned as Prime Minister and also as the Chairman of Socialist Party on 1 September 2005. Since then, he retired from public and political life. He rarely appears for interviews in some political talk shows.

After 2005, Nano did not attend parliament regularly but only came in a 6-month interval to claim his monthly pay cheque.

Presidential candidacy
In early 2007, Nano met with Sali Berisha to counter appeals from the Socialist Party to boycott the 2007 local government elections which would have triggered untimely parliamentary elections. Nano was elected candidate for President in the Presidential Elections of 2007 by the request of 20 Socialist MPs. Most members of the opposition coalition led by the Socialist Party did not support him, however, and choose to boycott this Presidential Election. Nano received only three votes, while Bamir Topi of the Democratic Party won 75 votes. Topi did not receive enough votes to be elected, however. The second round of voting was held on 10 July. However, the parliament still failed to elect a president, with Nano getting five votes and Topi receiving 74. Continued failure to elect a president would have resulted in an early parliamentary election, but on 20 July Topi was elected. In late August, it appeared likely Nano would found a new political party. Nano tried again to run for Presidency in 2012, but he did not even qualify for candidate, because the leaders parties in Parliament obstructed their respective MPs to elect him as candidate.

New movement inside Socialist Party
After the election of President of Albania in June 2012, Nano formed a movement called "Nano Movement for the victory of socialist" with the goal of retaking the leadership of the Socialist Party. Nano's past unpopularity due to his backroom deals with the equally unpopular former Prime Minister Sali Berisha have tainted his credentials and Edi Rama's popular judicial, administrative and economical reforms ensure that the latter maintains his position as Prime Minister and Leader of the Socialist Party in Albania.

Bibliography
The early life of Nano is narrated by the only biographical book for him in the Albanian language "Të jetosh kohën", written by his ex-wife Rexhina Nano and published in early 2008 which is extensively used as reference for the information provided in this article, also by Nano himself in his interview to journalist Blendi Fevziu in Opinion talk show during two episodes aired on TV Klan (Episode 1 and Episode 2).

Nano has a degree in political economy and a Ph.D. in economics from the University of Tirana.

He has published three books:
Socialimperializmi sovjetik në ekonominë kapitaliste botërore (1987)
Die Sowjetunion: ein kapitalistisches, imperialistisches Land (1988)
Dosja Nano (1994)

Nano was elected as a member of parliament from the districts of Tirana in 1991, Kuçovë in 1992, Tepelenë in 1997 and 2001, and Sarandë in 2005. In 2012, he was elected Honorary Member by the Socialist Party.

See also

 History of Albania
 Politics of Albania
Fall of communism in Albania

References

Further reading
  
Return to Europe: Fatos Nano

|-

|-

|-

1952 births
Living people
Albanian Christians
Members of the Parliament of Albania
Politicians from Tirana
Government ministers of Albania
Prime Ministers of Albania
Deputy Prime Ministers of Albania
Recipients of the Order of Skanderbeg (1990–)
Socialist Party of Albania politicians
Political party leaders of Albania
Albanian socialists
Heads of government who were later imprisoned